The 2010–11 Aviva Premiership was the 24th season of the top flight English domestic rugby union competition and the first one to be sponsored by Aviva. The reigning champions entering the season were Leicester Tigers, who had claimed their ninth title after defeating Saracens in the 2010 final. Exeter Chiefs had been promoted as champions from the 2009–10 RFU Championship, their first promotion to the top flight.

Summary
Saracens won their first title after defeating Leicester Tigers in the final at Twickenham after having finished second in the regular season table. Leeds Carnege were relegated on the last day of the season. It was the third time that Leeds have been relegated from the top flight since the leagues began and the first time since the 2007–08 Premiership Rugby season.

As usual, round 1 included the London Double Header at Twickenham, the seventh instance since its inception in 2004.

Teams
Twelve teams compete in the league – the top eleven teams from the previous season and Exeter Chiefs who were promoted from the 2009–10 RFU Championship to the top flight for the first time. They replaced Worcester Warriors who were relegated after six years in the top flight.

Stadiums and locations

Pre-season
The inaugural edition of the Premiership Rugby Sevens Series began on 16 July 2010 at The Stoop, continued on 23 July at Welford Road and 30 July at Franklin's Gardens.  This was the first opportunity of the season for any of the teams competing in the Premiership to win a trophy.  The finals were held on 6 August 2010 at The Recreation Ground and the Series was won by Saracens.

Table

Regular season
The fixture list was released on 29 June 2010.

Round 1

Round 2

Round 3

Round 4

Round 5

Round 6

Round 7

Round 8

Round 9

Round 10

Round 11

Round 12

Round 13

Round 14

Round 15

Round 16

Round 17

Rescheduled Game (Round 10)

Round 18

Round 19

Rescheduled Games (Round 10 & 11)

Round 20

Rescheduled Game (Round 11)

Round 21

Rescheduled Game (Round 10)

Round 22

Play-offs
As in previous seasons, the top four teams in the Premiership table, following the conclusion of the regular season, contest the play-off semi-finals in a 1st vs 4th and 2nd vs 3rd format, with the higher ranking team having home advantage. The two winners of the semi-finals then meet in the Premiership Final at Twickenham on 28 May 2011.

Bracket

Semi-finals

Final

Leading scorers
Note: Flags indicate national union as has been defined under WR eligibility rules. Players may hold more than one non-WR nationality.

Most points
Source:

Most tries
Source:

Season attendances

By club

Notes

References

External links
2010–11 English Premiership at ESPN
Match Attendance

 
2010–11
  
England